Laura Zacchilli (born 2 October 1980) is an Italian individual rhythmic gymnast. She represents her nation at international competitions. 

She participated at the 2004 Summer Olympics in Athens. She also competed at world championships, including at the 1999, 2001 and 2003 World Rhythmic Gymnastics Championships.

References

External links

http://www.the-sports.org/laura-zacchilli-gymnastics-spf145757.html
http://www.gettyimages.com/detail/news-photo/italian-gymnast-laura-zacchilli-competes-for-the-team-title-news-photo/103265340#italian-gymnast-laura-zacchilli-competes-for-the-team-title-with-the-picture-id103265340
https://www.youtube.com/watch?v=WWXYERDUQlI

1980 births
Living people
Italian rhythmic gymnasts
Place of birth missing (living people)
Gymnasts at the 2004 Summer Olympics
Olympic gymnasts of Italy
21st-century Italian women